Joseph Taylor (18 November 1907 – December 1992) was a British wrestler. He competed in the men's freestyle featherweight at the 1932 Summer Olympics. He was the cousin of fellow Olympic Wrestler Jack Taylor, Father to Professional Wrestler Eric Taylor and Grandfather of Dave Taylor

References

External links
 

1907 births
1992 deaths
British male sport wrestlers
Olympic wrestlers of Great Britain
Wrestlers at the 1932 Summer Olympics
Sportspeople from Bradford